Crosstown Line may refer to the following transit lines:

New York City
IND Crosstown Line in New York (rapid transit)
Crosstown Line (Brooklyn surface) (bus, formerly streetcar)
39th Street Crosstown Line on Church Avenue in Brooklyn (bus, formerly streetcar)

Toronto
Line 5 Eglinton, an under-construction rapid transit line in Toronto, Ontario, Canada, also known as the Crosstown Line

Washington D.C.
Crosstown Line (Washington, D.C.) (bus line)